The Amusements of Private Life) is a 1990 Italian-French comedy film co-written and directed by Cristina Comencini. According to the film critic Paolo Mereghetti, the film is very ambitious and has a careful attention to detail but also has some awkwardness and a confusing plot.

Plot

Cast 
 Delphine Forest as Mathilde Seurat / Julie Renard 
 Christophe Malavoy as Honoré de Dumont 
 Giancarlo Giannini as Charles Renard 
 Vittorio Gassman as Marquis 
 Roberto Infascelli as Jean-Jacques Renard 
 Roberto Citran as Belzé 
 Natalie Guetta as Nanny

References

External links

1990 films
Italian comedy films
Films directed by Cristina Comencini
1990 comedy films
French comedy films
French Revolution films
Films scored by Fiorenzo Carpi
1990s French films
1990s Italian films